Mark Shera (born July 10, 1949, Bayonne, New Jersey) is an American film and television actor.

Shera was cast from 1975 to 1976 in the television series S.W.A.T. in the role of Officer Dominic Luca. He also played J.R. in the television series Barnaby Jones from 1976-1980.

Filmography

Movies

Television

References

External links

1949 births
Living people
American male film actors
American male television actors
Actors from Bayonne, New Jersey
Male actors from New Jersey
Male actors from Los Angeles